Oman competed at the 2020 Summer Olympics in Tokyo. Originally scheduled to take place during the summer of 2020, the Games were postponed to 23 July to 8 August 2021, because of the COVID-19 pandemic.

Competitors
The following is a list of the number of competitors in the Games:

Athletics

Oman received a universality slot from the World Athletics to send two track and field athletes (one per gender) to the Olympics.

Track & road events

Shooting

Oman received an invitation from the Tripartite Commission to send a men's rifle shooter to the Olympics, if he or she attained the minimum qualifying score (MQS) on or before June 5, 2021.

Swimming

Oman received a universality invitation from FINA to send one top-ranked swimmer in their respective individual events to the Olympics, based on the FINA Points System of June 28, 2021.

Weightlifting

Oman received an invitation from the Tripartite Commission and the IWF to send Amur Salim Al-Khanjari in the men's 81-kg category to the Olympics.

References

Nations at the 2020 Summer Olympics
2020
2021 in Omani sport